Simon Kurt Unsworth (born 1972) is a British writer of supernatural fiction. Unsworth was born in Manchester, England. He grew up in Chorlton-cum-Hardy. He was educated at Manchester Grammar School and the University of Dundee where he received a Master of Arts degree in Psychology (Hons).

Unsworth's first novel is called "The Devils Detective" and Unsworth's most recent novel is The Devils Evidence, a horror novel set in Hell. James Lovegrove, in a review for the Financial Times, called the novel "an entertaining Dantean spin on the police procedural...The Devil's Detective is damned good".

Works

Books
 At Ease with the Dead: New Tales of the Supernatural and Macabre, (with others) Ash-Tree Press, 2007. .
 Creature Feature (with Guy N. Smith and William Meikle), Ghostwriter Publications, 2009. .
 The Devil's Detective : A Novel. New York : Doubleday, 2015. 
 The Devil's Evidence : A Novel. New York : Doubleday, 2016.

Collections
 Lost Places. Ash-Tree Press, 2010.
 Quiet Houses. Dark Continents, 2011.

Awards
 2008 - World Fantasy Award nomination for best short story for "The Church on the Island"

References

External links
 

1972 births
Living people
Alumni of the University of Dundee
English horror writers